Wai Lu Kyaw is a Burmese actor and philanthropists. He won the Myanmar Academy Award for Best Supporting Actor in 2010 with the film The Red Sun Above the Ocean.

Biography
Wai Lu Kyaw was born in Nyaungdon, Irrawaddy Division, Burma, to Tekkatho Nyo Lwin Maung and Tekkatho Nyo Nyo Thein, both are Burma National Literature Award-winning writers who established the Panhlaing Publishing Press. He began his acting career in 1997 as a child actor, starring in the films With the Green Valley and Hna Lone That Pyint Yin Ya Par The.

Wai Lu Kyaw is also active in humanitarian and social relief work. He is a member of Myanmar Red Cross Society. He is also a founding member of the Consumer Protection Association, and a member of the Civil Society (Yangon), which splintered from the Free Funeral Service Society following disputes with Kyaw Thu.

Sexual crimes

In January 2019, we media http://we.com.mm/ reported that A model Thin Thin accused Wai Lu Kyaw of sexually harassing, assaulting, or raping her. That day was first trail the court. .

Filmography

Modern Yazawin (2014)
39 Bite Pu (2014)

References

Burmese male film actors
People from Ayeyarwady Region
Year of birth missing (living people)
Living people
20th-century Burmese male actors